The Mars 2020 mission and its rover, Perseverance, and helicopter Ingenuity, were launched from Earth on 30 July 2020. On 15 February 2022, The New York Times reported an overview of Mars 2020 mission events since landing in Jezero crater on Mars in February 2021.

Current weather data on Mars is being monitored by the Curiosity rover and the Insight lander. The Perseverance rover is also collecting weather data. (See the External links section)

Overview of mission

Prelaunch (2012–2020) 
 4 December 2012: Mars 2020 mission announced by NASA.
 8–10 February 2017: Workshop held to discuss eight proposed landing sites for the mission. The three sites chosen were Jezero crater, Northeastern Syrtis Major Planum, and Columbia Hills.
 30 July 2020: Atlas V rocket launched from Cape Canaveral.

Landing and initial tests (February–May 2021) 

After arriving on the 18th of February, Perseverance focused on validating its systems.  During this phase, it used its science instruments for the first time, generated oxygen on Mars with MOXIE, and deployed Ingenuity.  Ingenuity began the technology demonstration phase of its mission, completing five flights before transitioning to the operations demonstration phase of its mission.
 18 February 2021: Landing in Jezero crater on Mars.
 20 February 2021: Perseverance records the first audio from the surface of another planet.
 4 March 2021: Perseverance rover's first test drive.
 5 March 2021: NASA named the Perseverance rover landing site "Octavia E. Butler Landing".
 3 April 2021: Deployment of Ingenuity.
 8 April 2021: NASA reported the first MEDA weather report on Mars: for 3–4 April 2021, the high was "minus-7.6 degrees, and a low of minus-117.4 degrees ... [winds] gusting to ... 22 mph".
 19 April 2021: First major flight test of Ingenuity.
 20 April 2021: MOXIE made 5.37 g of oxygen gas from carbon dioxide on its first test on Mars
 22 April 2021: Second flight test of Ingenuity
 25 April 2021: Third flight test of Ingenuity.
 30 April 2021: Fourth flight test of Ingenuity.
 7 May 2021: Fifth flight test of Ingenuity.  First one-way flight on Mars.  Ingenuity's mission transitions from being a technology demonstration to being an operations demonstration.
 22 May 2021: Sixth flight test of Ingenuity, first of the operations demonstration. A glitch with the navigation system caused the helicopter to land 5 meters away from its intended landing site.

Cratered floor campaign (June 2021-April 2022) 

The Cratered Floor Campaign was the first science campaign.  It began on 1 June 2021, with the goal of exploring the Crater Floor Fractured Rough and Séítah geologic units.  To avoid the sand dunes of the Séítah unit, Perseverance will mostly travel within the Crater Floor Fractured Rough geologic unit or along the boundary between the two units.  The first of Perseverances sample tubes are planned to be filled during this expedition.

After collecting the samples, Perseverance will return to its landing site, before continuing to the delta for its second science campaign.  At some point, it will store the filled sample tubes in a designated area for the upcoming NASA-ESA Mars Sample Return mission.  While Perseverance embarked on its first science campaign, Ingenuity continued to travel alongside the rover as part of its operations demonstration campaign.

 1 June 2021: Perseverance begins its first science campaign.
 8 June 2021: Seventh flight of Ingenuity.
 21 June 2021: Eighth flight of Ingenuity.  The “watchdog issue”, a recurring issue which occasionally prevented Ingenuity from taking flight, is fixed.
 5 July 2021: Ninth flight of Ingenuity.  This flight is the first to explore areas only an aerial vehicle can, by taking a shortcut over the Séítah unit.  The sandy ripples of the Séítah unit would prove too difficult for Perseverance to travel through directly.
 7 July 2021: To test its sampling system, the rover ran one sample tube through inspection, sealing and storing and the attempt was successful. Up to this point, the rover has now used 1 of its 43 sample tubes.
 24 July 2021: Tenth flight of Ingenuity.
 4 August 2021: Eleventh flight of Ingenuity.
 5-6 August 2021: Perseverance attempted to acquire its first sample from the ancient lakebed by drilling out "finger-size cores of Martian rock for return to Earth." This attempt did not succeed, as the rock sampled was not sufficiently consolidated to produce an intact core and has turned to dust.  Up to this point, the rover has now used 2 of its 43 sample tubes. Later on, the mission team confirmed that though soil samples were not cached, but in this process the rover cached the gas samples of the martian atmosphere in it, being the first gas samples cached by the rover.
 16 August 2021: Twelfth flight of Ingenuity.
1 September 2021: A second sampling attempt on a rock, named "Rochette", was successful.
4 September 2021: Thirteenth flight of Ingenuity.
8 September 2021: A third sampling attempt, also on Rochette, was successful.

27 September 2021: Perseverance records the first audio of a dust devil passing over the rover, along with air pressure data and imagery of the event.
1 to 14 October 2021: Mars Solar Conjunction.
24 October 2021: Fourteenth flight of Ingenuity.
6 November 2021: Fifteen flight of Ingenuity.
15 November 2021: A sample was taken from the Brac Outcrop in the South Séítah Unit.
21 November 2021: Sixteenth flight of Ingenuity.
24 November 2021: Another sample was taken from the Brac Outcrop.
5 December 2021: Seventeenth flight of Ingenuity.  Full data from the flight was not received until later, as Ingenuity initially landed in an area which prevented communication with the rover.
15 December 2021: Eighteenth flight of Ingenuity.
18 December 2021: A sample was taken from Issole in the South Séítah Unit.
29 December 2021: Perseverance attempted to take another sample from Issole, but was unable to successfully cache it.
31 January 2022: The failed sample attempt from Issole was abandoned, and a new, successful sample attempt was made on Issole.
8 February 2022: Nineteenth flight of Ingenuity.  It had been planned for earlier, but a dust storm in the area caused delays.
25 February 2022: Twentieth flight of Ingenuity.
7 March 2022: A sample was taken from Sid in the Séítah Unit.
10 March 2022: Twenty-first flight of Ingenuity.
13 March 2022: A second sample was taken from Sid in the Séítah Unit.
20 March 2022: Twenty-second flight of Ingenuity.
24 March 2022: Twenty-third flight of Ingenuity.
28 March 2022: Perseverance enters rapid traverse mode, where it will remain for the rest of the science campaign.
3 April 2022: Twenty-fourth flight of Ingenuity.
8 April 2022: Twenty-fifth flight of Ingenuity.  This flight went faster than all previous flights, at a speed of 5.5 meters per second.  It also travelled 704 meters, which was farther than all previous flights.
13 April 2022: Perseverance arrives at the Jezero Delta.

Delta front campaign (April 2022 - Present) 

The Delta Front Campaign is the second, currently ongoing science campaign of the Mars 2020 mission.  Ingenuity continues to travel alongside the rover as part of its operations demonstration campaign.  Once Perseverance traverses to the top of the delta, it is expected to begin the third science campaign - the Delta Top Campaign.

 18 April 2022: Perseverance officially begins the Delta Front Campaign.
 19 April 2022: Twenty-sixth flight of Ingenuity.
 21 April 2022: Perseverance leaves rapid traverse mode.
 23 April 2022: Twenty-seventh flight of Ingenuity.
 27 April 2022: NASA released images of the backshell that detached from the vehicle containing the Perseverance rover (and companion Ingenuity helicopter) during the landing phase on Mars in February 2021. The backshell and associated parachute were found about a mile from the landing site and images were taken by the companion helicopter during its 26th flight.
 3 May 2022: NASA loses contact with Ingenuity due to it running out of power during the night.
 5 May 2022: Contact with Ingenuity is regained. To avoid depleting the power, Ingenuity's heaters will not activate when battery temperature drops below -15° Celsius. Ingenuity instead will turn off all electronics when the temperature drops below -40°.
This represented a new record for Martian oxygen production! The peak rate was held for 1 minute of the 70 minutes oxygen was produced during the run.
 5 November 2022: Perseverance at Yuri Pass in Jezero Crater.
 23 November 2022: NASA reported that the Perseverance rover was now in an area within Jezero crater where life-friendly molecules were found in nearly every rock studied but, so far, no sign of an expected lake bed at this location.

Samples cached for the Mars sample-return mission 

Currently, samples are being cached by Mars 2020 Perseverance Rover on the surface of Mars. Out of 43 sample tubes, rock sample tubes cached-15, gas sample tubes cached-1, regolith sample tubes cached: 2, witness tubes cached-3, tubes due to be cached-22. Before launch, 5 of the 43 tubes were designated “witness tubes” and filled with materials that would capture particulates in the ambient environment of Mars.

Location and Current Status

Perseverance rover near ancient river delta

Gallery

Self-portraits

Videos

Images

Perseverance rover on Mars

Ingenuity helicopter's flights on Mars

Ingenuity helicopter on Mars

Ingenuity deployment and pre-flight operations on Mars

Landing

Launch

Prelaunch

Other images

Wide images

See also 

 Astrobiology
 Composition of Mars
 Curiosity rover
 Exploration of Mars
 Geography of Mars
 Geology of Mars
 InSight lander
 List of missions to Mars
 List of rocks on Mars
 Mars Exploration Rover
 Mars Express orbiter
 Mars Odyssey Orbiter
 Mars Orbiter Mission
 Mars Pathfinder (Sojourner rover)
 Mars Reconnaissance Orbiter
 Mars 2020 rover mission
 MAVEN orbiter
 Moons of Mars
 Phoenix lander
 Robotic spacecraft
 Scientific information from the Mars Exploration Rover mission
 Space exploration
 Timeline of Mars Science Laboratory
 U.S. Space Exploration History on U.S. Stamps
 Viking program
 Water on Mars

Notes

References

External links 

 
 Current Weather Report on Mars by the Perseverance rover – MEDA
 (MarsWxReport/temp; 1st Report/6apr2021; NASA-1; NASA-2)
 Mars Weather: Perseverance*Curiosity*InSight 
 Current Weather Report on Mars by the Curiosity rover
 Current Weather Report on Mars by the InSight lander
 Perseverance rover: Official website
 Mars 2020: Official website
 Mars 2020: Location Maps
  (related site; 2GB PNG-image)
 
 Video (60:00) – Minerals and the Origins of Life – (Robert Hazen; NASA; April 2014)
 Video (86:49) – Search for Life in the Universe – (NASA; July 2014)
 Video (13:33) – Mars Perseverance rover/Ingenuity helicopter report (9 May 2021; CBS-TV, 60 Minutes)
 Video (03:04) − Exploring Jezero Crater − (NASA; December 2021)

Astrobiology
Exploration of Mars
Spaceflight timelines
Articles containing video clips
2021 on Mars